Susan Maughan (born Marian Maughan, 1 July 1938) is an English singer who released successful singles in the 1960s. Her most famous and successful song, "Bobby's Girl" (a cover of the Marcie Blane single), reached number three in the UK Singles Chart at Christmas time in 1962. It also reached number six in the Norwegian chart in that year according to VG-liste 1962 https://en.wikipedia.org/wiki/VG-lista_1962. and number 23 in the Dutch singles chart.

Career
Maughan was born in Consett, County Durham. The sleeve notes on her 1963 album, written by John Franz, stated that
"Susan's family moved to Birmingham (in 1953) when Susan was 15. She started work there as a shorthand typist, but all the time she scanned the musical press to see if any band leaders needed a girl singer. Her luck was in as the well known Midlands band leader Ronnie Hancock was advertising for that very thing! An immediate audition was arranged, and Susan joined this fine band and sang happily with them for three years. In September 1961 Susan decided to try her luck in London, and during her brief 36-hour visit she won not only a recording contract but also a year's contract as featured singer with the Ray Ellington Quartet. Her biggest break came in September 1962 when she recorded 'Bobby's Girl'; her success brought so many offers that in November 1963 Susan decided to branch out as a solo artist."
In early 1963, following the success of "Bobby's Girl", Maughan had further minor UK hits entitled "Hand A Handkerchief To Helen" and "She's New To You". Also at that time she released her first album on Philips called I Wanna Be Bobby's Girl But.... All songs on this album featured male names, including the John D. Loudermilk songs "Norman" and "James (Hold The Ladder Steady)" which were hits in the US for the American singer Sue Thompson. Thompson had a minor UK hit in 1965 with "Paper Tiger", and the songs were also covered in the UK by Carol Deene.

John Franz's 1963 sleeve notes conclude: "Susan is one of the most conscientious artists in the entertainment industry – never quite believing in her own triumphs but continually striving to improve her work in every detail. This hard work, coupled with her natural singing talent can only lead to greater achievements in the future."

She appeared at the 1963 Royal Variety Performance, and in the 1963 film What a Crazy World. Maughan also appeared in the film Pop Gear (1965) and sang the title song for the second Charles Vine low-budget superspy film, Where the Bullets Fly (1966). In 1971, she appeared in series five of the Morecambe & Wise BBC television series, having previously appeared on their 1962 ATV series. In that year she also replaced Clodagh Rodgers in the show at London's Adelphi Theatre, Meet Me in London, after Rodgers withdrew just before curtain up on the first night when one of her songs was cut. Late in rehearsals it had become clear the show was too long for one running twice-nightly.

In 1974, she recorded the song, "Time", from the film, Dirty Mary, Crazy Larry, which she sang during her appearance the same year on the Wheeltappers and Shunters Social Club TV show.

From 1983 to 1988 she appeared in various Emu TV programmes  in the segment Boggles Kingdom alongside, Carl Wayne and Rod Hull. The segment revolved around Rod's ancestor King Boggle, his sister Princess Hortensia, played by Maughan and servant, Odd Job John who were trapped in medieval times. Maughan performed several songs during the show including a rendition of Let Me Entertain You from the musical Gypsy.

Personal life
She married advertising executive Nicolas Teller, February 1965. As of 2004 she was living in Eastbourne with second husband Nick Leigh, a theatre director.

Discography

Studio albums

Compilations

UK singles
 "I've Got To Learn To Forget" – (1962) – Philips
 "Baby Doll Twist" – (1962) – Philips
 "Mama Do The Twist" – (1962) – Philips
 "Bobby's Girl"  – (1962) – Philips – UK No. 3, Ireland No. 6, Israel No. 5
 "Hand a Handkerchief to Helen" – (1963) – Philips – UK No.41
 "The Verdict Is Guilty" – (1963) – Philips
 "She's New To You" – (1963) –  Philips – UK No.45
 "Hey Lover" – (1964) – Philips
 "Kiss Me Sailor" – (1964) – Philips
 "Little Things Mean A Lot" – (1964) – Philips
 "That Other Place" – (1964) – Philips
 "Make Him Mine" – (1964) – Philips
 "You Can Never Get Away From Me" – (1965) – Philips
 "When She Walks Away" – (1965) – Philips
 "Poor Boy" – (1965) – Philips
 "Where the Bullets Fly" – (1966) – Philips
 "Don't Go Home" – (1966) – Philips
 "Come And Get Me" – (1966) – Philips
 "To Him" – (1967) – (Philips)
 "I Remember Loving You" – (1968) – Philips
 "Cable Car For Two" – (1968) – Philips
 "We Really Go Together" – (1969) – Philips
 "Time (Is Such A Funny Thing)" – (1974) – Ember
 "El Bimbo" – (1975) – Ember

See also
 The Wheeltappers and Shunters Social Club
 Helen Shapiro

References

External links
 45-rpm website biography
 Susan Maughan mini-biography at the Internet Movie Database website

Living people
English women singers
People from Consett
1938 births
Philips Records artists